Susanna Ann (or Susannah Ann, or Susannah Anne). was a smack launched at Bridport or Cowes in 1814, almost surely under another name. Between 1823 and 1833 she made six voyages as a whaler and sealer in the British southern whale fishery. From around 1834 on she traded with Africa, and then in 1838 she sailed to New South Wales (NSW). She moved her registry to NSW and traded between east coast Australian ports and with New Zealand until she was wrecked on 20 March 1847.

Career
Susanna Ann first appeared in Lloyd's Register (LR) in 1823.

News of the discovery of the South Shetland Islands and a new sealing ground there had just reached England and so a number of owners sent vessels to the region to exploit the opportunity.

1st voyage (1823–1825): Captain Brown sailed from London on 12 September 1823, bound for the Falkland Islands. Susanna Ann returned to London on 26 June 1825 with 20 casks of oil, and 3,700 or 4,423 seal skins. 

2nd voyage (1825–1827): Captain Robert Ferguson sailed from London in 1825. Susanna Ann returned to London on 12 September 1827 with 3,320 seal skins.

3rd voyage (1827–1828): Captain Ferguson sailed from London on 16 October 1827. Susanna Ann returned to London on 8 July 1828 with 3,900 seal skins.

4th voyage (1828–1830): Captain Ferguson sailed from London in 1828. Susanna Ann returned to London on 14 May 1830 with 4,900 seal skins.

5th voyage (1830–1832): Captain Ferguson sailed from London on 17 August 1830. Susanna Ann returned to London on 21 August 1832 with 1780 seal skins. That year, while in the Falklands, Captain Ferguson shot some tame mares, sheep, and hogs belonging to Mr. Luis Vernet, whom the United Provinces of the River Plate had granted all of East Falkland, together with exclusive fishing and sealing rights. 

6th voyage (1832–c.1834): Captain Ferguson sailed on 13 November 1832. In March/April 1833, Britain took over the Falkland Islands. On 26 August 1833 "five Indian convicts and three gauchos" murdered  Captain Matthew Brisbane at Port Louis, Falkland Islands, angry at his attempts to protect Vernet's property in Vernet's absence. The gang also murdered four other men at the same time. Challeger rescued the surviving Europeans. Ferguson took advantage of the situation, taking all the seal skins that Brisbane had stored up. Susanna Ann returned to London on 28 April 1835. After she returned, she left sealing.

Susanna Ann arrived in Sydney and there in January 1839 she was offered for sale, freight, or charter. She proceeded to sail between Australia and New Zealand. In 1847 she was listed among the vessels belonging to Sydney.

Loss
On 19 March 1847 Susannah Ann was attempting to leave Queen Charlotte's Sound with a cargo of spars. She was driven ashore and wrecked. All aboard were saved, as was some of her cargo.

Notes and citations
Notes

Citations

1814 ships
Age of Sail merchant ships of England
Sealing ships
Maritime incidents in March 1847